Gaja Hornby is the fourth studio album and first Polish-language album by Polish singer Margaret. It was released digitally on 17 May 2019 and physically on 31 May 2019 by Artistars under exclusive license from Powerhouse, only in Poland. The album introduces Maragret's alter ego Gaja Hornby.

Gaja Hornby charted at number 13 in Poland. Its title track was released as the first single in April 2019, and was followed by "Serce Baila", "Chwile bez słów" (featuring Kacezet), and "Ej chłopaku". Margaret embarked on a concert tour in October 2019, to accompany the album's release.

Background and development
In 2018, Margaret revealed that she was working on her first Polish-language album. In March 2019, in an interview with Uroda Życia magazine, she announced that the title of the album would be Gaja Hornby, and that it would be released in April 2019; its release was later pushed back to 17 May. Prior to the album's release Margaret described it as her most honest record to date. The album was named after and introduced her alter ego Gaja Hornby. She created the name for her personal Facebook account at the beginning of her career to protect her privacy. It is a combination of a name she wished she was given at birth and the name of her favourite author Nick Hornby. Margaret explained that the reason she decided to use it as a name for the album was because this record is "much more personal" than her previous releases. She added that she is now ready to share the more personal side of her life with her fans as she is now older and has a "thicker skin".

Margaret announced that the album would be reissued at the beginning of 2020, after initially announcing an extended play as its sequel. Eventually, both projects were shelved.

Music and lyrics
Gaja Hornby incorporates a more urban sound in comparison to Margaret's previous bubblegum pop releases, and explores themes such as environmentalism, online hate speech and the dark side of fame.

Promotion

Singles
The album's title track was released as its lead single on 22 April 2019. The second and third singles, "Serce Baila" and "Chwile bez słów" featuring Kacezet, were released on 3 June 2019 and 10 July 2019 respectively. The fourth single, "Ej chłopaku", was released on 6 September 2019. Margaret also released a lyric video for the album's track "Błyski fleszy, plotki, ścianki" in October 2019.

Tour
Margaret embarked on a Gaja Hornby Tour, her first headlining concert tour, to accompany the album's release. It visited five clubs in Poland between 2 and 25 October 2019; the sixth and final show scheduled for 30 October was cancelled two days prior for undisclosed reasons. During the tour, Margaret performed songs from Gaja Hornby, some of her biggest hits, and three new songs.

Critical reception

Jarek Szubrycht in Gazeta Wyborcza praised Margaret for making progress as an artist and noted that Polish producers with whom she worked on the record significantly influenced its sound, which differs from that of her previous work, regarding it as a positive change.

Accolades

Track list

Charts

Release history

References

2019 albums
Margaret (singer) albums